Bradley Hindle (born 16 December 1980, in Mackay) is a professional squash player who represents Malta. He reached a career-high world ranking of World No. 64 in November 2008.

References

External links 
 
 
  (2010)
  (2014)

Squash players at the 2018 Commonwealth Games
Commonwealth Games competitors for Malta
Maltese male squash players
Living people
1980 births